The Railway Age may refer to:

Crewe Heritage Centre, in England, formerly known as The Railway Age
Railway Age, a North American railroad magazine